Utricularia tricolor is a medium to large sized perennial carnivorous plant that belongs to the genus Utricularia. U. tricolor, a terrestrial species, is endemic to South America, where it is found in Argentina, Brazil, Bolivia, Colombia, Paraguay, Uruguay, and Venezuela. It has a diploid chromosome number of 2n = 28.

See also 
 List of Utricularia species

References 

Carnivorous plants of South America
Flora of Argentina
Flora of Brazil
Flora of Bolivia
Flora of Colombia
Flora of Paraguay
Flora of Uruguay
Flora of Venezuela
tricolor